The Far Eastern University – Institute of Tourism and Hotel Management, or simply ITHM, is the academic institute offering culinary and hospitality programs of the Far Eastern University. Established in 2011, ITHM teaches theory and practice in hospitality and tourism management aligned with international standards.

History 
Established in 2011, ITHM is the youngest institute of the university. The institute was formed to handle the new Bachelor of Science in Tourism Management program (replacing the BS Commerce major in Tourism Management) and Bachelor of Science in Hotel and Restaurant Management, which was growing in student population at that time.

The Institute formally opened at the second semester of AY 2010–2011.

Degrees

Undergraduate

 Bachelor of Science in Hotel and Restaurant Management 
 Culinary Management Track
 Hotel Operations Track
 Bachelor of Science in Tourism Management 
 Travel and Tours Management Track
 Events Management Track

Facilities 
ITHM is housed within the Alfredo Reyes Hall, with purpose-designed professional standard kitchen, dining facilities, bar and demonstration rooms. Faculty are seasoned industry practitioners.

Café Alfredo 
Café Alfredo is a fully-functioning in-house café and restaurant in the Alfredo Reyes Hall managed by the HRM students of ITHM. It serves as a training ground for the students, with a facility for food service and management.

References

External links 
 Café Alfredo Official Facebook Page

Far Eastern University
Hospitality schools in the Philippines
Cooking schools in the Philippines